The Mary Ann Beinecke Decorative Art Collection is a research collection of more than 1200 volumes on textiles and decorative art subjects, which is held in the Library of the Sterling and Francine Clark Art Institute.

It was assembled over the course of her career by the weaver, textile artist and author Mary Ann Beinecke. The collection contains items spanning the period from 1550 to the 1970s and holds particular strengths in costume history, handicrafts and textile design. Collection interests include numerous examples of French manufacturers’ sample books of fabrics, lace, ribbons and trims; treatises on textile production; dye manufacturers’ formula books; bound sets of fashion plates; sketchbooks of kimono patterns; and textile sample books offering examples of traditional Japanese design.

Of exceptional note is a rare collection of 16th-, 17th-, and 18th-century weavers' pattern books, including several early editions of Nathanael Lumscher's Weber Kunst- und Bild-Buch. Beautifully illustrated interior decoration books offer glimpses into the trends of the late nineteenth century and many volumes provide rich reference material on the history of subjects encompassing ink, wallpaper, handmade lace, carpet and rug making, and textile production. Crochet, knitting and needlework pattern books provide instruction and inspiration for hand work projects, while informing on the aesthetics of their time.  A particular star of the collection is the Sample Book of Trims with its many samples of elaborately beaded appliques, metallic yarn embroidery and elegantly woven ribbon trimmings.

Collection Creation

In the early 1960s, Mary Ann founded Nantucket Looms and then the Nantucket School of Needlery, the only licensed needle arts school in the US.  The mission of the School was to train local young women in the needle arts, creating a form of employment which offered to them careers on the island as instructors in the resident School and teachers for the School's Nantucket School of Needlery Home Study Course, which Mary Ann wrote and illustrated in review with them.  Support from the Nantucket Historic Trust provided pay and housing for professionals in the textile arts from all over the world to teach needlery at the resident classes.  Workshops were offered year round in subjects such as tapestry, weaving, vegetal dye, spinning, bobbin lace, and silk screen printing. Mary Ann began her book collection as a personal research tool and source for her home study courses.  The collection was acquired through working with rare book dealers who specialized in her textile and decorative art interests, and was housed and curated in a library at the School.  When the School closed in the late 1970s, Mary Ann had moved to Williamstown; the collection was too large to house at home.  In the interests of her continued research and the significance of maintaining the entire collection in a single library available to scholars, the Clark Library was selected as the recipient of the collection.

Digitization

In 1977 Mary Ann made a generous donation of the collection to the Clark Art Library, which recently completed a digitization project of the collection, thus making 408 of the volumes freely accessible for research. Volumes included in the digitization project were selected for their rarity, fragility and structural complexity. The collection is supported in The Clark Digital Collections. The years’ work of the digitization project was completed with federal funding from a generous grant by the Institute of Museum and Library Services (IMLS) and with funding through the federal Library Services and Technology Act (LSTA).

Accessibility

The collection is non-circulating, but stacks volumes can be accessed by researchers during the regular working hours as listed on the Library home page. To access rare volumes researchers are encouraged to telephone, e-mail, or write in advance of their visit; contact information is located on the home page. Collection titles can be viewed in the  Library Catalog.
The digitized rare and stacks volumes are available online through The Clark Digital Collections, and the at Internet Archive Sterling and Francine Clark Art Institute Library Collection.

Notes on the Royal School of Needlework

"The Decorative Needlework of which so much has 
been said and written, of late, is a revival of old- 
time industries. Begun in London in 1872, this 
conjuration of forgotten needlecraft was chiefly 
due to the exertions of a lady moved to pity by the sad 
fate of a young governess who was found drowned in the 
Thames, desperate after a long struggle for livelihood 
in the only career open to her. The idea of creating a 
school for needlework of the higher ornamental class, thus 
prompted, has directed into a new channel the efforts of 
many women disqualified, by delicate health or for other 
reasons, for self-support by occupations requiring long continued exertion, mental or physical.

The Royal School of Art Needlework, first established in 
a small room over a shop in a side-street, is today a great 
and beneficent institution, occupying permanent quarters at 
South Kensington. Rare and elaborate specimens of antique 
embroidery, with their beautiful designs and multiplicity 
of stitches, are there restored or imitated, to decorate the 
wealthy homes of modern England; while the fresh designs 
of contemporaneous artists are constantly employed in the 
production of such examples as those made generally known 
in America by the Centennial Exhibition in 1876."--Woman's handiwork in modern homes (1881)

Material culture
The series De inlandsche kunstnijverheid in Nederlandsch Indie by J. E. Jasper and M. Pirngadie describes the material culture of the former Dutch East Indies (present-day Indonesia) and was first published in 1912. Part I deals with wicker work, basket weaving, and plaiting; Part II focuses on weaving, and Part III covers batik. The drawings by Mas Pirngadi are in color.

Notes on the illustrator: "Raden Mas Pirgadie was born in Banyumas, west Java, possibly in 1875. As he was from an aristocratic family, he had contact with Dutch residents of the Netherlands East Indies (Indonesia) including the artist F.J. Du Chattel (1856–1917), who taught him to paint with watercolours in 1889. Pirngadie was a very skilled and accurate draftsman, and made illustrations for J.E. Jasper’s monograph on traditional arts and crafts of the Netherland East Indies that was published in 1912. From 1928, he worked for many years at the Bataviasch Genootschap van Kunsten en Wetenschappen (Batavia Society of Arts and Sciences, now the Museum Nasional) in Batavia (Jakarta). He also designed airmail postaged stamps for the Post en Telegraafdienst (Post and Telegraph Services) of the Netherlands east Indies in 1931. He died in Batavia in 1936.

Pirngadie was a master of Western art techniques and produced naturalistic landscapes, portraits of people, and scenes of folk life. For the artist, the realistic technique was most suitable to express the beauty and images of things around him. His style of portraiture gave prominence to showing the accuracy of form, proportion and character of the object. These qualities made a portrait painting successful, standards which had a strong influence on the next generation of Indonesian artists."--MAS PIRNGADIE (c. 1875–1936)
 Jasper, J E, and Mas Pirngadie. De Inlandsche Kunstnijverheid in Nederlandsch Indië. 's-Gravenhage: Mouton & Co, 1912. NK1059 J38 Sterling and Francine Clark Art Institute. Library

"After Thomas Hope’s publications George Smith’s Collection of Designs is probably the most important and influential work on design and decoration of the Regency period both in Britain and America. It is evident that George Smith must have had either fairly accurate drawings or personal knowledge of the Duchess Street interiors and furnishings. ‘Hope's designs were put into general circulation by George Smith, the author of a pattern book which quickly followed Hope's publication and had practically the same title: A Collection of Designs for Household Furniture and Interior Decoration, 1808. Little so far is known about Smith’s career. He was a practising craftsman who claimed, without justification it seems, to be upholsterer to the Prince of Wales. There is certainly much emphasis on upholstery in his book, a concession to the growing interest in this branch of interior decoration which was largely due to the increasing output of materials from the factories. This was to be of importance for furniture design, not only in the attempt to relate curtains and window cornices to the various styles which were beginning to affect furniture but also in the thicker padding which was being applied to seats of all kinds with consequent influence on their design’ (Frances Collard, Thomas Hope’s Furniture, in: Thomas Hope, Yale, 2008).

‘Smith took over many of the classical features of Hope's designs. He makes great use of animal monopodia on a variety of pieces, tables, sideboards, chairs and sofas, for instance, of double lotus leaves meeting centrally in legs and stretchers, of winged feet on tables and cabinets, of console supports on tables and seats, and of varied fashionable decorative ornaments such as stars and bolt heads. His chairs in general adopt the straight lines which were considered to have been the distinguishing mark of ancient furniture, thus failing to continue the use of contrasting curves which were such an attractive feature of the ‘Trafalgar’ chair. His Household Furniture undoubtedly kept classical types of furniture very much alive, as did the reissue of Tatham’s Etchings in 1810. But Smith could not possibly match the scholarship which gave precision to many of Hope's designs. ‘Smith also paid great attention to Gothic designs; indeed his book of 1808 presents more illustrations of this style than any previous publication. He claims that Gothic produced ‘a more abundant variety of ornaments and forms than can possibly be obtained in any other style’, and he proceeds to apply his Gothic decoration to every kind of furniture. Herein the fundamental error of designing furniture in historical revivals becomes clear.

Smith's designs are not Gothic at all; they simply show furniture of current fashionable forms with the addition of Gothic ornament - pierced quatrefoils, crockets, pinnacles, pointed arches, etc. copied from medieval buildings The work was published as a complete volume in boards sometime in 1807 for £4 14s 6d or as here ‘elegantly coloured’ at £7 17s 6d. The British Critic for March 1806 advertises the issue in parts each containing 50 plates price £1 11s 6d each, plain; or elegantly coloured, £2. 12s 6d.’ The first group of 50 plates dated Dec. 1st 1804; the second group of 50 dated July 1st 1805 with the remaining plates dated Dec. 1st 1806 and Jan. 1st 1807. The first part with the most Hopean designs was clearly available by 1805 and thus prior to Hope’s own publication and not after as the title-page would seem to indicate."--Marlborough bibliography

See Joy, E. Pictorial Dictionary of British 19th century Furniture Design, 1977; Frances Collard Thomas Hope's Furniture in Thomas Hope Yale University Press, 2008; Abbey Life 71

References

External links
Sterling and Francine Clark Art Institute Library Collection at Internet Archive
The Clark Digital Collection
Sterling and Francine Clark Art Institute
Clark Library

Gallery

Decorative arts
Embroidery in the United States
Williamstown, Massachusetts